The Vagabond Queen, subtitled "a musical tale in one act", is a work of opera/musical theater by Edward Barnes.  "The Vagabond Queen" was written for the singer-actress, Kate Peters, when she and Barnes made a concert tour of Kansas, sponsored by the Kansas Arts Commission.  The director-choreographer Kimi Okada staged the piece, a production repeated numerous times on tours of the California State University campuses and for various opera conferences.  In March 2009, the work was performed by Peters and Barnes as part of the grand opening of Cal State Fullerton's new Clayes Performing Arts Center.  Other productions of "The Vagabond Queen" include those by Opera Pacific, Los Angeles Opera, University of Richmond, and the Diamond Opera Theater/Hudson Chamber Opera, among others.

Cast:  Queen/Vagabond, King, Foreign Ruler, Court Minister (all roles played by soprano)

Duration:  20 minutes.

Orchestration:  Piano, or piano, violin and 'cello.

References
 Opera For Youth Directory at Opera America

External links
"The Vagabond Queen" at Opera America
"The Vagabond Queen" at Diamond Opera Theater
The Vagabond Queen at Family Audience Opera

Operas
English-language operas
Children's operas